Steven A. Ansell  (born February 5, 1954), is an American violist whose versatile career involves work as a chamber musician, solo artist, and orchestral musician. Ansell is currently principal violist with the Boston Symphony Orchestra, a position he has held since September 1996. Prior to his appointment, Ansell had already appeared with the orchestra as a guest soloist. Ansell also currently teaches at the Boston University College of Fine Arts and is a member of the Boston Symphony Chamber Players. Ansell is also a founding member of the Muir String Quartet.

Biography
Ansell is a native of Seattle, Washington.  He graduated from the Curtis Institute of Music at the age of 21. While at Curtis, Ansell studied with Michael Tree and Karen Tuttle. Immediately following graduation, Ansell was hired as the professor of viola at the University of Houston. He left the university two years later at the age of 23 to become assistant principal violist of the Pittsburgh Symphony Orchestra under André Previn.

As a chamber musician Ansell has appeared with some of the finest chamber music organizations such as the Boston Chamber Music Society and Concord Chamber Music Society. He also regularly tours with the Muir String Quartet, which he co-founded in 1979. In January 2011, Ansell and the Muir String Quartet performed with former U.S. Secretary of State and pianist Condoleezza Rice.

Ansell's solo appearances include Mozart's Sinfonia Concertante with Malcolm Lowe under the baton of André Previn; Berlioz's Harold in Italy with Emmanuel Krivine; Bruch's Concerto for Viola, Clarinet and Orchestra with Seiji Ozawa; and Strauss's Don Quixote with Mstislav Rostropovich, among others. Ansell has also performed in concert with many other great musicians and conductors like Yo-Yo Ma, Steven Isserlis, Rafael Frühbeck de Burgos, Jian Wang, and Harry Ellis Dickson among others. Steven Ansell is a contributing editor to the Chicago-based online string music company Ovation Press, and has edited numerous works, including major symphonies by Beethoven and Brahms.

Ansell has done solo work with many fine ensembles including Sinfonia Concertante, the Boston Classical Orchestra, and the Boston Symphony Orchestra among others. He has also performed at such music festivals as Fredericksburg Festival of the Arts, Tanglewood Music Festival, Schleswig-Holstein Musik Festival, Marlboro Music Festival, Blossom Music Festival, Newport Music Festival, Festival dei Due Mondi, and Snowbird Music Festival.

As a recording artist Ansell has received two Grand Prix du Disque awards and a Gramophone Magazine award for Best Chamber Music Recording of the Year. He has appeared on PBS's "In Performance at the White House".

References

External links
 B.U. Bridge Article, September 1997
 Tech Article, October 2002

American classical musicians
American classical violists
Living people
1954 births
University of Houston faculty
Musicians from Seattle
Curtis Institute of Music alumni
Boston University faculty